Belmond Sanctuary Lodge is a small hotel situated at the entrance to the Machu Picchu Inca citadel. It is the only hotel at this World Heritage Site, and can be accessed by foot or by rail.

The explorer Hiram Bingham rediscovered Machu Picchu in 1911, and the site of this hotel was used as a place for researchers to stay from 1911 to 1946. The site included storage rooms where tools needed for work on the site could be kept.

The site changed hands several times, becoming the property of the regional government of Cusco, before passing to a company controlled by the Sousa Family, Peru Orient Express Hotels, today Peru Belmond Hotels.  The property was then renovated under the supervision of Peru's National Institute of Culture.

Chronology

References

External links 
 
Facebook Page
Twitter Profile

Belmond hotels
Hotels in Peru